Peristichia is a genus of sea snails, marine gastropod mollusks in the family Pyramidellidae, the pyrams and their allies.

Taxonomy
In his original paper, Dall proposed  Peristichia as a genus of dubious affinities and placed it later in the family Pyramidellidae. Paul Bartsch, his collaborator, later thought it was a subgenus of Turbonilla. Johannes Thiele does not even mention this genus in his Handbuch der Systematischen Weichtierkunde. (1929). Wilhelm August Wenz in his Handbuch der Paläozoologie, Band 6, Gastropoda, also thought it was probably a subgenus of Turbonilla, but added a question mark. However, a close examination shows that it belongs in the family Pyramidellidae, close to Tryptichus Mörch, 1875, differing from it only in having one (instead of two) basal central spiral cords and having no columellar fold.

Species
Species within the genus Peristichia include:
 Peristichia agria Dall, 1889
 Peristichia bathyraphe (G.B. Sowerby I, 1901)
 Peristichia hermosa (Lowe, 1935)
 Peristichia lepta Pimenta, Santos & Absalao, 2008
 Peristichia pedroana (Dall & Bartsch, 1909)
 Peristichia pliocena (Bartsch, 1955)
 Peristichia toreta Dall, 1889

References

External links
 To ITIS
 To World Register of Marine Species
 Dall, W.H. (1889). Reports on the results of dredging, under the supervision of Alexander Agassiz, in the Gulf of Mexico (1877-78) and in the Caribbean Sea (1879-80), by the U.S. Coast Survey Steamer "Blake", Lieut.-Commander C.D. Sigsbee, U.S.N., and Commander J.R. Bartlett, U.S.N., commanding. XXIX. Report on the Mollusca. Part 2, Gastropoda and Scaphopoda. Bulletin of the Museum of Comparative Zoölogy at Harvard College. 18: 1-492, pls. 10-40

Pyramidellidae